Dieter Versen (born 22 June 1945) is a German former professional footballer who played as a defender.

Career statistics

Notes

References

External links
 
 NASL career stats at NASLjerseys.com

1945 births
Living people
Sportspeople from Bochum
German footballers
Bundesliga players
VfL Bochum players
San Jose Earthquakes (1974–1988) players
North American Soccer League (1968–1984) players
German expatriate footballers
Expatriate soccer players in the United States
Association football defenders
Footballers from North Rhine-Westphalia